Massachusetts Route 32 is a state highway in the U.S. state of Massachusetts. The highway runs  from the Connecticut state line in Monson, where the highway continues as Connecticut Route 32, north to the New Hampshire state line in Royalston, where the highway continues as New Hampshire Route 32 (NH 32). Route 32 connects several towns on the eastern edge of Western Massachusetts. The highway serves Palmer in eastern Hampden County, Ware in eastern Hampshire County, and Barre and Athol in northwestern Worcester County. Route 32 intersects major east–west routes including U.S. Route 20 (US 20) and the Massachusetts Turnpike in Palmer (at I-90's exit 63, formerly exit 8), Route 9 in Ware, and US 202 and Route 2 in Athol. The highway has an alternate route, Route 32A, through Hardwick and Petersham.

Route description
Route 32 begins at the Connecticut state line in the town of Monson in southeastern Hampden County, from which the highway continues south as Connecticut Route 32 toward Stafford Springs. The highway heads north as two-lane Stafford Road and immediately has an oblique grade crossing of the New England Central Railroad. Route 32 crosses the watershed divide between the Middle River and Chicopee Brook. The highway follows the rail line and intersects it south of South Monson, where the highway becomes named Main Street, and crosses over the railroad in Monson. Route 32 becomes Palmer Lower Road between the latter village and North Monson, where the highway crosses over the rail line and Chicopee Brook. The highway crosses the Quaboag River, a tributary of the Chicopee River, just east of the mouth of Chicopee Brook and enters the town of Palmer as Main Street. Route 32 turns north onto Stone Street, crosses over CSX's Boston Subdivision rail line, and intersects US 20 (Park Street).

Route 32 runs concurrently west with US 20 along Park Street to downtown Palmer, where US 20 turns south onto Thorndike Street and Route 32 turns north. The highway intersects the connector from Interstate 90 (Massachusetts Turnpike) and heads northeast along Ware Street through Palmer Center to the town of Ware in Hampshire County. Shortly after entering the town, Route 32 passes under the Massachusetts Central Railroad and crosses the Ware River. The highway follows West Street to the center of town, where the highway intersects and joins Route 9 on Main Street. The highways cross the river, pass under the railroad, and leave town on East Street. The routes diverge just west of the Hampshire–Worcester county line, with Route 9 continuing east into West Brookfield and Route 32 turning north onto Gilbertville Road. The highway crosses back and forth between Ware and the Worcester County towns of West Brookfield and New Braintree as it parallels the river and rail line north.

Route 32 enters Worcester County for good and enters the town of Hardwick just south of Gilbertville, where the highway intersects the Massachusetts Central Railroad, crosses the Ware River, and meets the southern end of Route 32A (Hardwick Road). Route 32 exits the village on Church Street and continues northeast parallel to the rail line and river on Lower Road. The highway enters the town of Barre on Wheelwright Road. The route crosses the river and meets the northern end of Route 67 at its turn onto Main Street in the village of South Barre. Route 32 turns north again onto Barre Road and crosses the Ware River for the last time. The highway follows the Prince River to the town center of Barre, where the highway begins to run concurrently with Route 122 (Worcester Road) and meets the western end of Route 62 (Mechanic Street) at the Barre Common. Route 32 and Route 122 head west out of town on West Street, then veer north into Petersham, where they follow Barre Road. In the town center, Route 32 turns north onto Main Street while Route 122 continues on New Salem Road. The intersection serves as the northern terminus of Route 32A, which heads west concurrently with Route 122 then turns south on Hardwick Road west of the town center.

Route 32 meets the western end of Route 101 (Popple Camp Road) then has a partial cloverleaf interchange with US 202 and Route 2 shortly after entering the town of Athol on Petersham Road. The highway meets Route 2A (Templeton Road) north of the interchange; the highways head toward downtown along Main Street. Once there, Route 32 turns onto Chestnut Hill Avenue, crosses over the Pan Am Southern rail line and the Millers River, then veers onto Silver Lake Street. The highway follows the East Branch of the Tully River into the town of Royalston as Athol-Richmond Road. Route 32 intersects Route 68 (Warwick Road) before reaching its northern terminus in the northwestern corners of both Royalston and Worcester County at the New Hampshire State line. The highway continues north into Richmond and toward Keene along NH 32 (Athol Road).

History

Route 32 follows much of the course of the 1920s era New England Interstate Route 32, a part of the New England road marking system that ran from Groton, Connecticut, through Palmer and Athol, to Newport, New Hampshire.

Major intersections

Auxiliary route

Massachusetts Route 32A is an alternate route of Route 32 in Hardwick and Petersham. The highway runs  between intersections with Route 32 in those towns, providing a more direct route that bypasses Barre. Route 32A begins in the Hardwick village of Gilbertville. The highway heads north through the town center of Hardwick and intersects Route 122 west of the center of Petersham. Route 32A runs concurrently east with Route 122 to its northern terminus at Route 32.

Major intersections

References

032
Transportation in Hampden County, Massachusetts
Transportation in Hampshire County, Massachusetts
Transportation in Worcester County, Massachusetts